First Flight Airport  is a public use airport located  west of the central business district of Kill Devil Hills, a town in Dare County, North Carolina, United States. The airport is owned by the U.S. National Park Service. It is included in the National Plan of Integrated Airport Systems for 2011–2015, which categorized it as a general aviation facility.

The airport itself is famous for being the site of hundreds of pre-flight gliding experiments carried out by the Wright brothers. The Wright Brothers National Memorial, located atop nearby Kill Devil Hill, is a 60-foot granite pylon paying homage to the Wright Brothers and the first sustained heavier-than-air flight. The U.S. Centennial of Flight Commission also chose the airport as one of the stops for the National Air Tour 2003.

History
On December 17, 1903, the first successful powered heavier-than-air aircraft flight occurred here, conducted by the Wright brothers.

Facilities and aircraft 
First Flight Airport covers an area of 40 acres (16 ha) at an elevation of 13 feet (4 m) above mean sea level. It has one runway designated 3/21 with an asphalt surface measuring 3,000 by 60 feet (914 x 18 m). For the 12-month period ending April 18, 2018, the airport had 37,500 aircraft operations, an average of about 103 per day: 99% general aviation and 1% military.

References

External links
 U.S. National Park Service: Wright Brothers National Memorial
  at North Carolina DOT airport guide
 Aerial image as of March 1993 from USGS The National Map

Airports in North Carolina
Airports established in 1903
Transportation in Dare County, North Carolina
Buildings and structures in Dare County, North Carolina
Outer Banks
National Park Service
1903 establishments in North Carolina